Allomyrina dichotoma, also known as Japanese rhinoceros beetle, Japanese horned beetle, or , is a species of rhinoceros beetle.

Etymology
In Japanese, rhinoceros beetles are called . Mushi is Japanese for insect, and kabuto is Japanese for helmet, literally referring to the samurai helmet. The beetle's Korean name 'Jangsupungdeng-i (장수풍뎅이, "General beetle") sounds very differently but is similar in nature. In Chinese the beetle is called '獨角仙' (which translates to 'single-horned immortal') or '雙叉犀金龜'.

List of subspecies

 Allomyrina dichotoma dichotoma: Mainland China, Korean Peninsula
 Allomyrina dichotoma inchachina: Kume Island
 Allomyrina dichotoma septentrionalis: Tsushima Island, Japanese mainland except Hokkaido
 Allomyrina dichotoma takarai  Okinawa
 Allomyrina dichotoma tunobosonis: Taiwan Island
 Allomyrina dichotoma politus: Indochina
 Allomyrina dichotoma tsuchiyai: Kuchinoerabu Island
 Allomyrina dichotoma shizuae: Yakushima Island, Tanegashima Island

Description

Allomyrina dichotoma shows a striking sexual dimorphism. The males are much larger, reaching a length of 40–80 mm, while females can reach a length of about 40–60 mm. The long cephalic horn of this species has a characteristic shape in the form of the letter Y and it is used by males during the mating period and to maintain territories. By means of their forked horn they lift other males off the ground and throw them into the air. In addition to their impressive and ornate protuberance they also have a smaller thoracic horn, also forked. Their eyes may be white or red and are adapted to low light levels, as this species is nocturnal. The body is dark brown, while the ventral part of the body is black and brilliant and the front legs are unusually long. Like all Dynastinae species, these beetles are strong flyers, although they never cover long distances during the flight.

Distribution and habitat
This species is present in Japan (Honshu, Kyūshū and other islands including Okinawa), Taiwan, Korean Peninsula and eastern China. It can be found in broad-leaved forests in tropical and subtropical mountainous habitats. Across populations and regions, male beetles can vary greatly in size and horn performance, and it is suggested that differences are due to relative intensities of selection.

Life cycle and behavior
 The Japanese rhinoceros beetle will live most of its life underground in larval and pupal stages, spending only about four months as an actual beetle before death. The earliest beetles will emerge from the ground in late spring; they will usually die around mid-September to early October. Their preferred foods are tree saps, fruits and anything sugary.

Male beetles normally die in the fall after mating many times, while female beetles normally die shortly after laying eggs as reproduction shortens their lifespan. Fighting occurs among males competing for mates and territory. The eggs are laid directly in the ground, which will hatch into larvae that usually mature in a year. 

Japanese kabuto breeders are trying to find supplements to make the Japanese rhinoceros beetle mature faster and grow to a larger size.

In the larval stage, it can decompose recalcitrant wood material and humus efficiently through secreting various digestive enzymes comprising cellulase, glycanase, and glycosidases to degrade lignocellulose-rich plant polymers. This has been harnessed industrially to biotransform the waste substrate from mushroom production. To study this process, a 636.27 Mb/10 chromosome reference genome was produced, and transcriptome analysis carried out on larvae feeding on sawdust or mushroom residue. Revealing that the expression of digestive enzyme genes was significantly higher in the midgut.

In Japanese culture

Japanese rhinoceros beetles are very popular in anime, tokusatsu, advertisements, televisions, and films in Japan. Characters based on Kabutomushi include the title characters from Kamen Rider Stronger and Kamen Rider Kabuto, kaiju Megalon from the Godzilla franchise, and Heracross from the Pokémon series of video games.

Many children in Japan buy or catch these beetles and breed them. Male and female insects will cost about 500 to 1000 yen (approximately five to ten US dollars). This beetle is sold as a pet in department stores in many countries of Asia where it is also frequently depicted in popular media as a common cartoon character for various uses; for example, gorillas, lions, and T. rex are seen in advertisements and product labels in the United States.

Japanese rhinoceros beetles are popular in gambling, especially in the Ryukyu Islands, similar to Siamese fighting fish and cricket fights. In the most popular game, two different male beetles are placed on a log to battle each other, trying to push each other off the log, with the one to stay on the log deemed the winner.

Bibliography
 Hongo Y. 2010. Does flight ability differ among male morphs of the Japanese horned beetle Trypoxylus dichotomus septentrionalis (Coleoptera Scarabaeidae)? Ethology Ecology & Evolution, 22(3): 271-279.
 Hongo Y. 2003. behaviour during male-male interaction in the Japanese horned beetle Trypoxylus dichotomus septentrionalis (Kono). Behaviour, 140(4): 501-517.
 Iguchi Y. 2010. Female-fighting-and-mounting.pdf Intrasexual fighting and mounting by females of the horned beetle Trypoxylus dichotomus (Coleoptera: Scarabaeidae). Eur. J. Entomol., 107: 61–64.
 Van Truong T., Byun D., Lavine L.C., Emlen D.J., Park H.C., Kim M.J. 2012. Flight behavior of the rhinoceros beetle Trypoxylus dichotomus during electrical nerve stimulation. Bioinspiration & biomimetics, 7(3): 036021.

References

External links

Photos of Allomyrina dichotoma septentrionalis
Photos of Allomyrina dichotoma tunobosonis
Photos of Allomyrina dichotoma

Dynastinae
Beetles of Asia
Insects of Japan
Beetles described in 1771
Taxa named by Carl Linnaeus